The Profit Impact of Market Strategy (PIMS) program is a project that uses empirical data to try to determine which business strategies make the difference between success and failure. It is used to develop strategies for resource allocation and marketing. Some of the most important strategic metrics are market share, product quality, investment intensity and service quality (all measured by PIMS and strongly correlated with financial performance).  One of the emphasized principles is that the same factors work identically across different industries. The business management authors Tom Peters and Nancy Austin wrote that PIMS "yields solid evidence in support of both common sense and counter-intuitive principles for gaining and sustaining competitive advantage".

History 

The PIMS project was originally initiated by senior managers of General Electric who wanted to know why some of their business units were more profitable than others. Under the direction of Sidney Schoeffler, an Economics Professor hired by GE for the purpose, the PIMS project was launched in the 1960s as an internal empirical study. The aim was to make GE's different strategic business units (SBUs) comparable.

Since GE was highly diversified at the time, key factors were sought that would have an impact on economic success regardless of the product. In particular, the return on investment (ROI), i.e. the profit per unit of tied capital, was used as the measure of success. In 1972, the project was transferred to the Marketing Sciences Institute (then under the wing of Harvard Business School, which extended it to other companies. In 1976, the American Strategic Planning Institute in Cambridge, Massachusetts, took charge of the project. 

Between 1970 and 1983, roughly 2600 strategic business units (SBUs) from around 200 companies took part in the surveys and provided key figures for the project. Today there are around 12,570 observations for 4200 SBUs. PIMS Associates in London has been the worldwide competence and design canter for PIMS since the 1990s and has been part of Malik Management (Fredmund Malik) in St. Gallen (Switzerland) since 2005.

The PIMS project analyses the data they had gathered to identify the options, problems, resources and opportunities faced by each SBU. Based on the spread of each business across different industries, it was hoped that the data could be drawn upon to provide other businesses, in the same industry, with empirical evidence of which strategies lead to increased profitability. The database continues to be updated and drawn upon by academics and companies today.

The PIMS databases currently comprise over 25,000 years of business experience at the SBU level (i.e. where the customer interface takes place and where marketing and investment decisions are made). Each SBU is characterized by hundreds of factors over a period of 3+ years, including the market share of itself and its competitors, customer preference, relative prices, service quality, innovation rate, vertical integration, etc., as well as a number of market luring factors and fairly detailed income statement, balance sheet and employee data.

Data collected 

In the PIMS study, more than 50 different core metrics were regularly surveyed. The most important of these are presented below: 

Characteristics of the business environment (market attractiveness):
 (Short/long-term) market growth
 Market size
 Distribution channels (direct, wholesale, retail, etc.)
 Customer characteristics (purchase amount, frequency, importance, etc.)
 Inflation (materials and energy, labor costs, prices)
 Position in product life cycle

Competitive strength:
 Relative market share (compared to the 3 largest competitors)
 Relative innovation rate and product line breadth
 Location cost advantage
 Relative marketing effort (salesforce, advertising, promotion)
 Relative market coverage
 Relative product quality
 Characteristics of the service provision

Supply chain fitness:
 Investment intensity (= investment volume / turnover)
 Extent of vertical integration versus outsourcing
 Labor productivity
 Capacity utilization
 Investment mix (fixed vs working capital)
 Lean overheads
 Marketing intensity (= marketing expenditure / sales)
 Research and development intensity (= research and development expenses / sales)

Dynamics of change
 Changes in competitive strengths 
 Changes in supply chain fitness

Economic success factors (as variables to be explained):
 Return on investment (ROI) (= profit / tied capital)
 Return on sales (ROS) (= profit / sales)
 Real growth

While most of the variables appear obvious, PIMS has the advantage of providing empirical data that defines quantitative relationships and attributes them to what some would consider reasonable.

Participation in the PIMS study: cost and benefits 

Companies wishing to use the service will provide detailed information, for each of their main strategic business units including:
 Market and customer structure
 Competitive strengths and weaknesses
 Income statement and balance sheet
 Existing market projections and business plans.

Based on the data provided, PIMS provides four reports (Lancaster, Massingham and Ashford):

 A "par" report - shows the expected profitability for this business profile – and why that differs from an average business
 A "strategic analysis" report, which calculates the predicted consequences using several alternative strategic measures. It takes into account information from companies operating in a comparable business environment and facing a similar starting point.
 A "Report on Look-Alikes" (ROLA), which aims to understand why each SBU's performance is above or below “par” by analyzing income statements and balance sheets of strategically similar businesses in more detail.
 An "Optimal Strategy" report aims to predict the best combination of strategies for the company, based on the experience of other companies in "similar" circumstances which some would consider reasonable.

Results

The following factors correlate particularly strongly with the ROI and ROS success factors:

Investment intensity correlates negatively (explains approx. 15 %):

On the one hand, this has the formal-analytical reason that with increasing investment intensity, i.e. the investment volume in relation to sales, the depreciation volume in relation to sales, the depreciation intensity, also increases and thus the profit decreases. On the other hand, if the investment intensity is high, the fixed assets increase and there is an urge to also use these capacities, i.e. to increase the output volume and under certain circumstances to lower the prices and thus the profit margin.

Relative market share correlates positively (explains approx. 12 %):

The main reason for the positive influence of the relative market share is the economies of scale: The higher the market share, the larger the production volume and the lower the unit costs; this can also be explained by the experience curve. Moreover, as the market share increases, so does the power vis-à-vis the suppliers, which means that better conditions can be achieved.

Relative product quality correlates positively (explains approx. 10 %):

Important reasons for the positive correlation are above all higher achievable prices for premium products, but also the higher willingness of consumers to buy high-quality services, so that the sales volume increases and thus positively influences the market share (see above).
Another reason is the lower complaint costs.

Overall, the factors surveyed explain about 70 percent of the differences in profitability between successful and unsuccessful business areas in the PIMS database (measured as variance).

Commentary about PIMS 

It can be argued that a database operating on information gathered in the period 1970–1983 is outdated. However, data continues to be collected from participating companies and PIMS argues that it provides a unique source of time-series data, the conclusions from which have proven to be very stable over time.

It has also been suggested that PIMS is too heavily biased towards traditional such as car manufacturing; this is perhaps not surprising, considering the era in which the majority of the surveys were carried out. However, as of 2006, the 3,800+ businesses contained within the database include data from the consumer, industrial and service sectors.

It is also heavily weighted towards large companies, at the expense of small entrepreneurial firms. This resulted from the data collection method used. Generally, only larger firms are prepared to pay the consulting fee, provide the survey data, and in return have access to the database in which they can compare their business with other large businesses or SBUs. Mintzberg (1998) claims that because the database is dominated by large established firms, it is more suitable as a technique for assessing the state of "being there rather than getting there". (page 99)  This criticism is very important because if one is trying to get "average" results across industries to give us the "laws of the marketplace", a dubious enterprise as it is, the sampling strategy is important if one wants to obtain results that are representative.

→ The PIMS master database at the heart of the PIMS program now includes more than 25,000 years of business experience across a broad spectrum of industries worldwide. These are more than 90% of the companies to be processed. About one-third of them manufacture consumer goods, 15% manufacture capital goods. The remaining business units are suppliers of raw materials and semi-finished products, components or accessories for industry and commerce. Trade and services companies account for less than 10% of total companies and yet represent a fairly large sample (over 250) of strategic business units in this category. About half of the business units in the PIMS database market their products or services nationally in the United States or Canada, while 11% serve regional markets in North America. European companies are also numerous today, with around 1,000 business units from continental European countries and 600 from the UK. 

The most important criticism leveled at PIMS is the fact that causation implies correlation but correlation does not imply causation.  One of the most important "findings" of the PIMS program was to find a statistically significant relationship between profitability and market share (see Buzz ell and Gale (1987)).  The empirical work conducted by PIMS suggested that high market share yielded high profitability, but this correlation cannot be considered a "true" causal relationship because correlation does not imply causation.  In the multivariate correlation analysis, high market share was associated with high profits, but high profits could have been associated with high market share, or a third factor common to both could have caused the correlation.  Many analysts believe that it is possible to use a statistical causality test to determine causation, but if the whole problem is that correlation is insufficient to determine causation in the first place, then how can using another correlation, which is what is used in the tests, determine causation.

→ In connection with the market share, already indicated and frequent allegations that correlations are used in the PIMS investigations to draw conclusions about causal relationships, i.e. correlation is equated with causality. However, this problem is too obvious not to have been examined in detail during the development of the PIMS program. Backhaus et al. formulate this aptly: "The primary field of application of regression analysis is the investigation of causal relationships (cause-effect relationships), which we can also refer to as "The more the" relationships". Backhaus et al. (2006), p. 46 (Emphasis in the original.) These authors then add the following: "It should be emphasized here that neither regression analysis nor other statistical methods can prove causalities beyond doubt. Rather, regression analysis can only prove correlations between variables. This is a necessary but not yet sufficient condition for causality." Backhaus et al. (2006), p.48 f. Within the framework of the PIMS studies, it was thus possible to determine causalities with the help of time series analyses due to the availability of data over longer periods. See, for example, Barylite (1994), p. 61. Correlations in this sense, including in the PIMS program, initially give nothing other than a reason to investigate possible causalities substantiated and intensively.'' Causation cannot be investigated by statistical methods.  Granger causality utilizes time series methods to examine statistical causation.  However, both regression analysis and granger causality rely on correlations between variables.  Correlation is not sufficient to determine causation.

Another important criticism of PIMS is that it does not take into account heterogeneity in the data set.  The presumption of PIMS analysis is that the same "laws of the marketplace" apply to all industries.  However, the statistical assumptions employed in the econometric analysis make the assumption that all cross-sectional observations come from one statistical distribution that is the same for all cross-sectional observations.  This tends to be the Achilles heel of virtually all cross-sectional analyses.  If this homogeneous assumption is false, then cross-sectional observations are being drawn from different populations.  While one can use estimation techniques such as fixed-effects to control for different population means, co-variances can also differ across populations (meaning behavior differs across populations) and the only way one can control for this aspect is to run regressions on each population separately.  This means that the "laws of the marketplace" differ across populations, directly contradicting one of the main presumptions of using the PIMS data base for analysis.

Telis and Golder (1996) claim that PIMS defines markets too narrowly. Respondents described their market very narrowly to give the appearance of high market share. They believe that this self reporting bias makes the conclusions suspect. They are also concerned that no defunct companies were included, leading to "survivor bias".

See also
 Strategic management
 Marketing strategies
 Business model
 Benchmarking

References

 Buzzell, R. and Gale, B. (1987) The PIMS Principles: Linking Strategy to Performance, Free Press, New York, 1987.
 Mintzberg, H. Ahlstrand, B. and Lampel, J. (1998) Strategy Safari: A guided tour through the wilds of strategic management, The Free Press, New York, 1998.
 Schoeffler, S. Buzzell, R. and Heany, D. (1974) Impact of Strategic Planning on Profit Performance, Harvard Business Review, March–April, 1974.
 Tellis, G. and Golder, P. (1996) First to Market, First to Fail: The Real causes of enduring market leadership, Sloan Management Review, vol. 37, no. 2, 1996.
 Ceccarelli, P. and Roberts, K. (2002) I nuovi principi PIMS: la gestione dell'impatto sul profitto, Sperling & Kupfer, Milano, 2002.
 Pedram Farschtschian: Private Equity für die Herausforderungen der neuen Zeit: Strategists Innovation für das Funktionieren von Private Equity im 21. Jahrhundert. Campus Verlag, Frankfurt 2010, 

Business intelligence terms
Marketing strategy
Databases